Nawab Changez (Jangayz) Khan Marri  is the Nawab of the Marri Baloch people in Balochistan. He has served as Balochistan's Irrigation and Energy Minister since 15 October 2013.

Family
Changez Khan Marri is the eldest son of the late Khair Bakhsh Marri and is the legal heir for the title, chieftain of the Marri tribe and rightly so installed as Nawab. His brothers are Hyrbyair Marri, Balach Marri, Ghazan Marri, Hamza Marri and Mehran Marri.

Politics
Changez Khan Marri was elected to the Provincial Assembly of Balochistan as a member of the PMLN-Nawaz in 2013 General Election.

He was a contender for the Chief Minister of Balochistan.

An unidentified assassin threw a grenade at Changez Marri's residence on 15 January 2016. The grenade failed to detonate and no one was harmed.

See also
Ataullah Mengal
Ghaus Bakhsh Bizenjo
Gul Khan Naseer
Muhammad Aslam Khan Raisani
Sarawan
Jhalawan
Sanaullah Khan Zehri

References

External links
Changez Marri PB-21 candidate
PB-21 candidates
Changez Marri

Living people
Baloch people
Balochistan MPAs 2013–2018
Nawabs of Pakistan
Nawabs of Balochistan, Pakistan
Pakistan Muslim League (N) politicians
Tumandars
Changez
Year of birth missing (living people)